Michael Luciano (May 2, 1909 – September 15, 1992) was an American film and television editor with about forty feature film credits and many additional credits for television programs. From 1954 to 1977, Luciano edited 20 (nearly all) of the films directed, and often produced, by Robert Aldrich. Aldrich was a prolific and independent maker of popular films "who depicted corruption and evil unflinchingly, and pushed limits on violence throughout his career." Their early collaboration, the film noir Kiss Me Deadly (1955), was entered into the US National Film Registry in 1999; the unusual editing of the film has been noted by several critics. Luciano's work with Aldrich was recognized by four Academy Award nominations, for Hush...Hush, Sweet Charlotte (1964), The Flight of the Phoenix (1965), The Dirty Dozen (1967), and The Longest Yard (1974).

Early career
Nothing appears to have been published about Luciano's early career and education. In the era of the Hollywood studio system and the "Big Five" studios, Luciano's credits are for films produced by smaller companies. His first credit is as the editor of The Luck of Roaring Camp, a 1937 film produced by Monogram Pictures, which was a "Poverty Row" studio. He edited Gang War (1940), which was produced by Million Dollar Productions. His last credit before the US entry into World War II was apparently for Meet the Chump (1941).

Luciano's first postwar credit was for The Return of Rin Tin Tin (1947), which was the 41st feature film that starred the German shepherd dog Rin Tin Tin and his successors. Also in 1947, Luciano was the assistant to editors Robert Parrish and Francis D. Lyon on the boxing film Body and Soul, which was directed by Robert Rossen. The film won the Academy Award for Best Film Editing. Luciano worked for Parrish again as the "montage editor" on the 1949 film, Caught, and then co-edited the 1951 documentary Of Men and Music with Parrish and two others. Parrish subsequently moved into directing, and Luciano was the editor for Parrish's 1959 western, The Wonderful Country.

The Aldrich collaboration

Robert Aldrich was an assistant director on Body and Soul, Chase, and Of Men and Music. He asked Luciano to edit the 1954 film World for Ransom, which was the first film he produced and directed. Joseph F. Biroc was the cinematographer, and Frank De Vol composed the music. Luciano, Biroc, and De Vol became Aldrich's "informal repertory company" for the next two decades. In 1955 Luciano edited Aldrich's Kiss Me Deadly, which is an important film noir that is now in the National Film Registry. Luciano edited almost all of Aldrich's films that followed Kiss Me Deadly, including three in the following year.

Aldrich enjoyed particular success with the 1962 film What Ever Happened to Baby Jane? and its offspring Hush...Hush, Sweet Charlotte (1964). The latter film won Luciano his first major recognition with a nomination for the Academy Award for Best Film Editing, which was just one of the seven "Oscar" nominations for the film. The following year, Luciano's editing of The Flight of the Phoenix was nominated both for the Oscar and for the Eddie Award of the American Cinema Editors. The film that was Aldrich's greatest commercial success was The Dirty Dozen (1967), which had the fifth largest US ticket sales in 1967. Luciano won the Eddie award for the picture, and was again nominated for the Oscar. The Longest Yard (1974), again directed by Aldrich, garnered Luciano his second Eddie Award and a fourth Oscar nomination.

The final film of the long Aldrich-Luciano collaboration was Twilight's Last Gleaming (1977). For about 23 years, Luciano had been a member of Aldrich's "informal repertory company", which also included cinematographer Joseph F. Biroc and composer Frank De Vol. Ben Sachs has written of Aldrich's motivations in maintaining a core group of collaborators over more than two decades. He notes that Aldrich admired the studio system, which could keep teams of filmmakers together for decades. Aldrich's career saw the collapse of that system, but "Aldrich sought to preserve the team of collaborators — which included cinematographer Joseph Biroc, composer Frank De Vol, editor Michael Luciano, and production designer William Glasgow — with whom he'd regularly worked since his second feature, World for Ransom (1954). ... In interviews he presented himself as an organizer of creative talents who encouraged his casts and crews to help shape the material at hand."

Other works
Luciano edited several more features before his retirement around 1982, including Stripes (1981), which was directed by Ivan Reitman. In addition to his editing of feature films with Aldrich and other directors, Luciano was a prolific editor of television programs in the 1950s and 1960s, with credits for episodes of Gunsmoke, Have Gun – Will Travel, The Donna Reed Show, and other series. In 1956, Luciano edited one episode of Gunsmoke that was directed by Charles Marquis Warren, and over the next two years Luciano edited three feature films directed by Warren. Luciano was nominated for an Eddie for a 1964 episode of the television program Bewitched. Luciano's last film project was Kidnapped (1987), for which he is credited as a supervising editor and an associate producer.

Luciano's legacy
Luciano's editing has been noted in several books and articles. In his book Film Noir, William Luhr notes the editing of Kiss Me Deadly as part of the film's "disorienting, even disturbing, formal strategies." J.P. Telotte writes that, "one of the pillars of classical narrative, continuity editing, often disappears - or to be more precise, repeatedly fails, as in a later work like Breathless, so that we see the seams in the narrative, the manipulations in our point of view, the mismatched fragments of the story constructed for us."

In their 2002 text, Robert Goodman and Patrick McGrath recommend study of Luciano's editing of The Dirty Dozen and The Longest Yard. In his study of films with sports themes, Randy Williams discusses the influence of The Longest Yard (1974): "Aldrich uses split-screen and slow motion techniques to help convey the tension and drama as the game progresses. The real key is the pinpoint timing of Michael Luciano's editing...The Longest Yard is still one of the more influential movies in sports cinema."

Glenn Erickson has discussed the split-screen editing of Twilight's Last Gleaming, which was Luciano's final film with Aldrich, "In this show Aldrich and Luciano make effective use of split screens to show multiple parallel actions simultaneously. Actions that play out in real time seem more immediate, when we see all the information all at once: a pair of commandos set a nuclear device on one side of a steel door, while on the other side General Dell and his fellow gunmen begin to guess that just such a commando sneak attack might be taking place." Ben Sachs notes that the clearly visible editing that characterized Kiss Me Deadly was toned down in later films by Aldrich and Luciano, "Intriguingly, Aldrich's style grew more modest as his content grew more provocative. Where his 1950s and 1960s work teems with hopped-up editing and Wellesian camera angles, his later films are comparatively straightforward...The filmmaking privileges content over style, pushing to the foreground the contradictions inherent in the material."

Luciano had been selected as a member of the American Cinema Editors.

Selected filmography
 Luck of Roaring Camp (1937)
The Return of Rin Tin Tin (1947)
World for Ransom (1954)
The Big Knife (1955)
Kiss Me Deadly (1955)
Autumn Leaves (1956)
Attack (1956)
The Halliday Brand (1957)
The Ride Back (1957)
The Unknown Terror (1957)
Copper Sky (1957)
Blood Arrow (1958)
The Wonderful Country (1959)
The Last Sunset (1961)
What Ever Happened to Baby Jane? (1962)
Black Zoo (1963)
4 for Texas (1963)
Hush...Hush, Sweet Charlotte (1964)
The Flight of the Phoenix (1965)
The Dirty Dozen (1967)
The Killing of Sister George (1968)
The Legend of Lylah Clare (1968)
Too Late the Hero (1970)
The Grissom Gang (1971)
Ulzana's Raid (1972)
Emperor of the North Pole (1973)
The Longest Yard (1974)
Hustle (1975)
Twilight's Last Gleaming (1977)
Empire of the Ants (1977)
The One Man Jury (1978)
Hardly Working (1980)
Stripes (1981)

See also
List of film director and editor collaborations

References

Further reading
Irv Slifkin has quoted Aldrich on the importance of both producing and directing his films: "The power is for the director to do what he wants to do. To achieve that he needs his own cutter, he needs his cameraman, he needs his own assistant and a strong voice in his choice of writer; a very, very strong voice on who’s the actor. He needs the power not to be interfered with and the power to make the movie as he sees it." See

External links

1909 births
1992 deaths
People from Schuylkill County, Pennsylvania
American film editors
American Cinema Editors